Manoj Pande is an Indian civil servant serving as the current Member (Staff) of the Indian Railways Board since 2019. Manoj Pande is a 1989 Batch Indian Railway Personnel Service (IRPS) officer. Prior to Member (Staff) of the Indian Railways Board he served as Director General (Personnel) of Railway Board.

Education
Manoj Pande did his bachelor's degree in Economics from Kirori Mal College, University of Delhi, and law from the Rani Durgavati Vishwavidyalaya. He completed his master's degree in Economics from Delhi School of Economics and also hold a MBA degree from Human Resource Management from Indira Gandhi National Open University. He also holds a diploma in Russian language Jawaharlal Nehru University.

References

Delhi School of Economics alumni
Indian Railways officers
Indian civil servants
Indira Gandhi National Open University alumni
Jawaharlal Nehru University alumni
Living people
Place of birth missing (living people)
Year of birth missing (living people)